Meghna Group is one of the largest Bangladeshi conglomerates. The industries under this conglomerate include automobile, light engineering (bicycle), cement, packaging, textile etc. Meghna Group was established by Bangladeshi entrepreneur Mizanur Rahman Bhuiyan. It is Bangladesh's largest bicycle manufacturer and said to be sold in Bangladesh, as well as in countries like Germany, UK and other parts of Europe. They are one of the top garments manufacturer in Bangladesh exporting to Europe high end fashion brands. 

Meghna Group has also invested in Prime Bank, a commercial bank in Bangladesh.

List of companies
 Meghna Automobiles Limited (Kia Motors, etc.)
 Executive Motors Limited (BMW)
 Veloce Bicycles
 Mohammad & Sons
 Kohler
 Hana System Limited
 AlCa Industries Ltd.
 Meghna Denims Ltd.
 Uniglory Washing Ltd.
 Transworld Bicycle Co. Ltd
 Uniglory Cycle Industries Ltd
 Mahin Cycles Ltd
 M&U Cycles Ltd.
 M&U Packaging Ltd.
 Beta Packaging Ltd.
 Uniglory Cycle Components Ltd
 Abrar Steels Ltd
 Meghna Bearing Ltd
 Meghna Rubber Industries Ltd
 Uniglory Wheels Ltd
 Meghna Knit Composite Ltd.
 Uniglory Packaging Industries Limited
 Meghna Mainetti Limited
 Uniglory Components Limited
 Siam-Bangla Industries Limited
 Executive Technologies Ltd. (Acer etc.)
 Executive Machines Limited (Apple etc.)
 Uniglory Paper & Packing Ltd
 Meghna Innova Rubber Co. Ltd.
 Cycle Life Exclusive Ltd.
 Antics Graphic Ltd.
 M&N Fashion.
 Meghna Melamine Industries Ltd. 
 Uniglory Tyres Industries Limited
 Suntec Tyre Limited
Reflex packaging ltd.

See also
 List of companies of Bangladesh

References

External links
 

Manufacturing companies based in Dhaka
Manufacturing companies established in 1989
Conglomerate companies of Bangladesh